A list of the senators of the College of Justice in Scotland from its establishment in 1532 to the present day.

List 
# signifies Commissioners for the administration of justice under the Commonwealth

Gallery

References

Sources
 An Historical Account of the Senators of the College of Justice from its Institution in MDXXXII by George Brunton and David Haig, published by Thomas Clark MDCCCXXXII – for entries 1689 to 1850 only
  – for entries 1851 to present (with corrections)

Historic
Lists of office-holders in Scotland
College of Justice
Lists of judges in Scotland